Yalata is an Aboriginal community located  west of Ceduna and  south of Ooldea on the edge of the Nullarbor Plain in South Australia. It lies on the traditional lands of the Wirangu people, but the settlement began as Yalata Mission in the early 1950s when Pila Nguru people were moved from Ooldea Mission when that closed, after previously being moved from their land in the Great Victoria Desert owing to nuclear testing by the British Government.

The old Colona sheep station nearby is now part of Yalata Indigenous Protected Area.

History
Yalata lies on the traditional lands of the Wirangu people. Decades after the European settlement of South Australia began in 1836, a  sheep station known as Yalata station was established, with its homestead built in 1880 located on a high hill inland from Fowlers Bay, where there was then a town known as Yalata. Its land stretched  from the Nullarbor Plain across to Point Brown near Streaky Bay on the Eyre Peninsula. The huge sheep station ran up to 120,000 sheep at times.

In the 1950s, areas around Maralinga and Emu were used for nuclear testing by the British Government. Around this time the Australian Government resumed much Anangu land to be used for the Woomera Rocket testing Range. Aboriginal people in the area, who were Pila Nguru (Spinifex people, of the Great Victoria Desert) were moved to a United Aborigines Mission (UAM) at Ooldea, before that closed in 1952 due to internal divisions. The people  did not want to move from there, as they were used to ranging the desert, and had used the Ooldea Soak as a water source for many generations.

In 1951 South Australian Government bought the entire Yalata sheep station, including its 7,000 sheep, "for the benefit and use of aborigines", and in 1954 turned the whole area bar two sections into an Aboriginal reserve under the South Australian Aborigines Protection Board. The "spiritual welfare and education" of the Aboriginal people were handed over to the Evangelical Lutheran Church of Australia, South Australian District, who would also run the property as a sheep station, with the remaining more than 6,000 sheep. The Board would contribute to the cost of caring for the people, and take care of their medical needs, and hoped to establish "a worthy institution".

A group of Ooldea people who were in the process of moving themselves to Ernabella and many others were forcibly removed to Yalata, which was an environment quite alien to them. Missionaries from the Koonibba Mission assisted with the move to the reserve, where the Ooldea people remained for two years before the Yalata Mission was created. Before the mission was set up, the Lutherans were concerned that having a different denomination such as the UAM running a mission so close to Koonibba would confuse the Aboriginal people who would inevitably move between the two, as the teachings were different. The Lutheran missionaries planned to teach the mission residents how to raise sheep, and the mission would be run in conjunction with Koonibba. The government would take about 50% of the gross income of the station.

The mission included administrative buildings, a school and a store. Residents lived in two camps: the "Big Camp" moved around the reserve at different times of the year, while Aboriginal mission workers and their families", and some of the elderly or sick residents lived in the "Little Camp".

By 1969, many of the 300 people living at the mission were working on the nearby Colona Station (which by around 2007 was part of the Yalata Indigenous Protected Area).

In 1974 the Yalata Community Council took over the whole reserve, and the mission ceased operation as a mission.

The Maralinga Tjarutja native title land was handed back to the Anangu under legislation passed by both houses of the South Australian Parliament in December 1984 and proclaimed in January 1985. Inland Anangu resettled on the land in 1995 and formed a community at Oak Valley. Regular movement of Anangu between Yalata and Oak Valley continued to occur.

Yalata Roadhouse was closed in February 2006.

In August 2007, fire destroyed the shed-structure police station and associated home, with damage estimated at approximately 500,000.

In July 2018, a unit of the Australian Army were posted in Yalata charged with building a new staff house and a child care centre; roadworks; upgrading the caravan park; and safely demolishing the old asbestos-riddled Yalata roadhouse.

Environment
The Atlas of South Australia describes the Yalata area as:

Demography
Pitjantjatja was spoken as the primary language in 50.4% of homes in the Yalata area, specifically a southern dialect.

The main religion of residents was as follows, Lutheran: 37.3%, no religion 15.4%, Australian Aboriginal traditional religions: 10.8% and not stated: 33.6%.

Governance
Yalata is governed at the local level by the Yalata Community Council, one of the several local government bodies in South Australia classified as Aboriginal Councils (AC).

At the state and federal levels, Yalata lies in the electoral district of Flinders and at the division of Grey, respectively.

Facilities
There is a caravan park to assist tourists passing through or visiting the Great Australian Bight for fishing or whale watching.

Yalata Anangu School provides R-12 education.

Yalata Mission Airport is a single-runway airstrip that serves the community and nearby lands.

References

Further reading

External links

 (Local Government Association of South Australia website)

Towns in South Australia
Aboriginal communities in South Australia
Yalata
Nullarbor Plain
Eyre Highway